Igor Plastun (born 20 August 1990) is a Ukrainian professional footballer who plays as a defender for Bulgarian First League club Ludogorets Razgrad.

Club career
After progressing through the youth system at Obolon Kyiv, Plastun became a first team regular during 2010–11 season and made over 60 appearances for the club before signing for Karpaty Lviv in 2012.

On 10 June 2016, Plastun signed for Bulgarian club Ludogorets Razgrad for an undisclosed fee, believed to be €500,000.

On 12 June 2018, Plastun signed a four-year contract with Belgian club Gent.

In June 2021, he returned to Bulgarian club Ludogorets Razgrad, after spending 3 seasons with Gent. On 11 June 2021, Plastun joined the training camp, taking number 30, as his previous number 32 had already been taken by Josué Sá. In the summer of 2022 he was elected Bulgarian Footballer of the Year for the season 2021–22.

International career
Plastun made his debut for Ukraine national football team on 16 November 2018 in a 2018–19 UEFA Nations League B game against Slovakia, as a 14th-minute substitute for Serhiy Kryvtsov, who had sustained an injury.

Honours
Ludogorets Razgrad
 Bulgarian First League: (3) 2016–17, 2017–18, 2021–22
 Bulgarian Supercup: (2) 2021, 2022

Individual
 Bulgarian Footballer of the Year: 2021–22

References

External links
 
 
 
 

1990 births
Living people
Footballers from Kyiv
Association football defenders
Ukrainian footballers
Ukraine under-21 international footballers
Ukraine youth international footballers
Ukraine international footballers
FC Obolon-Brovar Kyiv players
FC Obolon-2 Kyiv players
FC Karpaty Lviv players
Ukrainian Premier League players
Ukrainian First League players
Ukrainian Second League players
PFC Ludogorets Razgrad players
First Professional Football League (Bulgaria) players
K.A.A. Gent players
Belgian Pro League players
Ukrainian expatriate footballers
Expatriate footballers in Bulgaria
Ukrainian expatriate sportspeople in Bulgaria
Expatriate footballers in Belgium
Ukrainian expatriate sportspeople in Belgium